Andrej Bogićević (born 3 January 2002) is a Serbian professional footballer who plays as a striker for Spartak Subotica.

Club career

Partizan
Bogicevic started to play football at the age of seven, his first club was Jadar from Gornji Dobrić. Then he moved to FK Loznica, and then Savacium Sabac. When he scored two goals against  Partizan, he received an invitation of the legendary Momčilo "Moca" Vukotić to join the younger categories of Partizan. At the beginning he played friendly matches where he proved himself with goals and deserved to be registered in Partizan.

Grafičar
He moved from  Partizan to Čukarički, where he signed a scholarship agreement. After that he went from Banovo brdo to Voždovac, and then to Grafičar. He played his best games in that club where he deserved a transfer and the first professional contract

Zlatibor
Bogićević signed his first professional contract with Zlatibor at the middle of the 2020–21 season when the club competed in the Serbian Super League. On 5 January 2021, he became a player of the team from Čajetina. He made his debut on 12 February 2021 in Superleague match against Proleter in which the result was 2–2 and he spent 45 minutes on the field. He played a total of 11 games in his first professional half-season, in the Serbian elite.

Spartak Subotica
On 2 September 2021, he signed a four-year contract with Spartak Subotica.

Career statistics

Club

References

External links
SuperLiga
footbalzz

Living people
2002 births
Sportspeople from Loznica
Serbian footballers
Serbian expatriate footballers
Association football forwards
FK Zlatibor Čajetina players
FK Spartak Subotica players
Serbian SuperLiga players